Juan David Perry Cruz (born 29 December 1957) is a Peruvian politician and a former Congressman, elected in the 2006 general elections, representing the Madre de Dios region for the 2006–2011 term. Perry belongs to the National Restoration party but later switched to the National Solidarity. He lost his seat in the 2011 general election when he ran for re-election under the National Solidarity Alliance of former Lima Mayor Luis Castañeda, but he attained a low number of votes.

External links

Official Congressional Site

Living people
National Restoration (Peru) politicians

1957 births
National Solidarity Party (Peru) politicians
Members of the Congress of the Republic of Peru
Place of birth missing (living people)